Bonnie Laverne Bracey is an American teacher and technology consultant based in Washington, D.C. Bracey was the only teacher selected by the Clinton Administration for serving on the National Information Infrastructure Advisory Council, whose work in the mid 1990s led to the creation of the E-rate program. She also served as lead educator on President Bill Clinton's 21st Century Teacher Initiative.

In 1993, Bracey was selected as a Christa McAuliffe Educator, and subsequently worked with NASA on various education programmes. Currently she is an international educational consultant; in this capacity she conducts outreach activities for the George Lucas Education Foundation and other groups. Bracey is an active member of the Digital Divide Network.

References

 Bracey profile, NII Advisory Council

External links
 Bonnie Bracey's Digital Divide Network profile
 Bracey's Web log
 Bibliography of Works by and About Bonnie Bracey 
 Bonnie Bracey and Rosa Parks Before the Departure of Rosa Parks
 Bonnie Bracey and Educational Technology and the New York Times
 EDUCATION: TECHNOLOGY: Bonnie Bracey, Teachers and Technology

Digital divide activists
Schoolteachers from Washington, D.C.
American women educators
Living people
Year of birth missing (living people)
21st-century American women